Konguk Station is a station on Hyŏksin Line of the Pyongyang Metro.

The station is located across from Potonggang Station, a railway station and freight hub with a marshaling yard.

The station features mural The River Pothong of Paradise.

References

External links
 

Pyongyang Metro stations
Railway stations opened in 1978
1978 establishments in North Korea